Tomasz Robert Taylor (born February 23, 1954) is a Polish-American theoretical physicist and faculty at Northeastern University in Boston, Massachusetts, United States of America. He obtained his PhD degree from the University of Warsaw, Poland in 1981 under the supervision of Stefan Pokorski. He is a descendant of John Taylor who originated from Fraserburgh in Scotland and emigrated to the Polish-Lithuanian Commonwealth c.1676.

He is known for his discovery, with Stephen Parke, of Parke–Taylor amplitudes, also known as maximally helicity violating (MHV) amplitudes; his pioneering use of supersymmetry for computing scattering amplitudes in quantum chromodynamics; his seminal work, with Ignatios Antoniadis, Edi Gava and Kumar Narain, on topological string amplitudes; his formulation, with Ignatios Antoniadis and Hervé Partouche, of the first four-dimensional quantum field theory with partial supersymmetry breaking; his extensive studies, with Stephan Stieberger, of superstring scattering amplitudes.

Honors 
 2009 Fellowship of the American Physical Society
 2015 Membership in the Polish Academy of Learning

References

External links 
 MHV@30: Amplitudes and Modern Applications
 Scientific publications of Tomasz Robert Taylor on INSPIRE-HEP

1954 births
Living people
Theoretical physicists
Mathematical physicists
People associated with CERN
People associated with Fermilab
Polish scientists
University of Warsaw alumni
Members of the Polish Academy of Learning